Tropical World may refer to:

Tropical World (Leeds), Leeds, England
Tropical World, Marwell Zoo, England
Tropical World (Letterkenny), a zoo in Ireland